The OVW Women's Championship is a women's professional wrestling championship in Ohio Valley Wrestling (OVW). The first holder of the title was ODB, who declared herself champion in August 2006. The belt was defended as any other championship in professional wrestling until Serena Deeb declared she would defend the belt under 24/7 rules in May 2008. These rules lasted until Melody won the belt in November 2008.

Jessie Belle holds the record for most reigns, with eleven and at 343 days, Josie/Lady JoJo sixth reign is the longest in the title's history. Reggie and The Baroness' first and only reigns are the shortest in the title's history at less than a day. The Bodyguy is the first and only male to hold the title. Overall, there have been 88 reigns shared among 42 wrestlers, with seven vacancies. The current champion is Shalonce Royal who is in her first reign.

History
Its initial appearance was at OVW's July 12, 2006 television taping, when ODB appeared with a title belt, claiming she had won it in a tournament in Rio de Janeiro, Brazil (a nod to World Wrestling Entertainment kayfabe stating that the WWE Championship and WWE Intercontinental Championship originated in tournaments in Rio de Janeiro). It was not recognized as an official OVW title originally, but after ODB began defending it on a regular basis it became an official title, and has since been won by other women.

On May 23, 2008, after winning the title for the second time, Serena Deeb proclaimed that she would defend the OVW Women's Championship at all times as long as a referee was present. This new "24/7 rule", which was a nod to the WWE Hardcore Championship, became an official part of the championship and was effectively utilized by several OVW Divas, including Deeb herself. The rule came to an end on November 12 after Melody won the title from Deeb during a fatal four-way match.

After being vacated for one year, Jessie Belle won a battle royal at OVW's Brews and Bruises event on November 21, 2015, to win the championship for the third time.

In early July 2016, it was announced that the Championship would be contested under 24/7 rules, with the title even changing hands outside of TV shows or live events. Things could soon revert to normal held rules on August 17, 2016 when Maria James won the Women's Championship back for the sixth time.

Reigns
ODB was the inaugural champion. Lady JoJo's sixth reign is the longest at 343 days, while JoJo's third reign, alongside The Baroness, Jessie Belle's sixth, seventh, ninth and tenth reigns, Maria James' third–fifth reigns are the shortest lasting less than a day. Belle has the most reigns at 11 times. Rebel is the oldest champion at 38 years old, while Madi Maxx is the youngest at 19 years old. The Bodyguy	is the first male wrestler to hold the title.

Shalonce Royal is the current champion in her first reign. She defeated Leila Grey on October 29, 2022, at Saturday Night Special - No Rest for the Wicked in Louisville, KY.

Combined reigns

References

External links
 Wrestling-Titles.com
 OVW Women's Title History at Cagematch.net

Ohio Valley Wrestling championships
Women's professional wrestling championships
Recurring sporting events established in 2006
2006 establishments in Kentucky